Constantin Dan Găldean (born 18 May 1974) is a Romanian former football player who played on the right wing. Găldean had a brief spell in the Ukrainian Premier League with Dnipro and Kryvbas Kryvyi Rih. He is also the all-time goalscorer for Unirea Alba Iulia in the Liga I.

References

External links 
 
 

1974 births
Living people
People from Sebeș
Romanian footballers
Association football midfielders
Liga I players
Liga II players
CS Gaz Metan Mediaș players
CSM Unirea Alba Iulia players
FC Politehnica Timișoara players
FC Universitatea Cluj players
CSM Jiul Petroșani players
CS ACU Arad players
CS Național Sebiș players
Ukrainian Premier League players
FC Dnipro players
FC Kryvbas Kryvyi Rih players
Romanian expatriate footballers
Romanian expatriate sportspeople in Ukraine
Expatriate footballers in Ukraine
Romanian football managers
CS Național Sebiș managers